Dicobalt octacarbonyl is an organocobalt compound with composition . This metal carbonyl is used as a reagent and catalyst in organometallic chemistry and organic synthesis, and is central to much known organocobalt chemistry. It is the parent member of a family of hydroformylation catalysts. Each molecule consists of two cobalt atoms bound to eight carbon monoxide ligands, although multiple structural isomers are known. Some of the carbonyl ligands are labile.

Synthesis, structure, properties
Dicobalt octacarbonyl an orange-colored, pyrophoric solid. It is synthesised by the high pressure carbonylation of cobalt(II) salts:

The preparation is often carried out in the presence of cyanide, converting the cobalt(II) salt into a pentacyanocobaltate(II) complex that reacts with carbon monoxide to yield . Acidification produces cobalt tetracarbonyl hydride, which degrades near room temperature to dicobalt octacarbonyl and hydrogen. It can also be prepared by heating cobalt metal to above 250 °C in a stream of carbon monoxide gas at about 200 to 300 atm:

It exist as a mixture of rapidly interconverting isomers. In solution, there are two isomers known that rapidly interconvert:

The major isomer (on the left in the above equilibrium process) contains two bridging carbonyl ligands linking the cobalt centres and six terminal carbonyl ligands, three on each metal. It can be summarised by the formula  and has C2v symmetry. This structure resembles diiron nonacarbonyl but with one fewer bridging carbonyl. The Co–Co distance is 2.52 Å, and the Co–COterminal and Co–CObridge distances are 1.80 and 1.90 Å, respectively. Analysis of the bonding suggests the absence of a direct cobalt–cobalt bond.

The minor isomer has no bridging carbonyl ligands, but instead has a direct bond between the cobalt centres and eight terminal carbonyl ligands, four on each metal atom. It can be summarised by the formula  and has D4d symmetry. It features an unbridged cobalt–cobalt bond that is 2.70 Å in length in the solid structure when crystallized together with C60.

Reactions

Reduction
Dicobalt octacarbonyl is reductively cleaved by alkali metals and relatived reagents. The resulting alkali metal salts protonate to give tetracarbonyl cobalt hydride:

Reactions with electrophiles
Halogens and related reagents cleave the Co–Co bond to give pentacoordinated halotetracarbonyls:

Cobalt tricarbonyl nitrosyl is produced by treatment of dicobalt octacarbonyl with nitric oxide:

Reactions with alkynes
The Nicholas reaction is a substitution reaction whereby an alkoxy group located on the α-carbon of an alkyne is replaced by another nucleophile. The alkyne reacts first with dicobalt octacarbonyl, from which is generated a stabilized propargylic cation that reacts with the incoming nucleophile and the product then forms by oxidative demetallation. 

 reacts with alkynes to form a stable covalent complex, which is useful as a protective group for the alkyne.  This complex itself can also be used in the Pauson–Khand reaction.

Intramolecular Pauson–Khand reactions, where the starting material contains both the alkene and alkyne moieties, are possible. In the asymmetric synthesis of the Lycopodium alkaloid huperzine-Q, Takayama and co-workers used an intramolecular Pauson–Khand reaction to cyclise an enyne containing a tert-butyldiphenylsilyl (TBDPS) protected primary alcohol. The preparation of the cyclic siloxane moiety immediately prior to the introduction of the dicobalt octacarbonyl ensures that the product is formed with the desired conformation.

Hydroformylation
Hydrogenation of  produces cobalt tetracarbonyl hydride :

This hydride is a catalyst for hydroformylation – the conversion of alkenes to aldehydes. The catalytic cycle for this hydroformylation is shown in the diagram.

Reduction
This salt yields the hydride on acidification, providing an alternative synthetic pathway to that species. Salts of this form are also intermediates in the cyanide synthesis pathway for dicobalt octacarbonyl.

Substitution reactions
The CO ligands can be replaced with tertiary phosphine ligands to give . These bulky derivatives are more selective catalysts for hydroformylation reactions. "Hard" Lewis bases, e.g. pyridine, cause disproportionation:

Conversion to higher carbonyls
Heating causes decarbonylation and formation of tetracobalt dodecacarbonyl:

Like many metal carbonyls, dicobalt octacarbonyl abstracts halides from alkyl halides. Upon reaction with bromoform, it converts to methylidynetricobaltnonacarbonyl, by a reaction that can be idealised as:

Safety
 a volatile source of cobalt(0), is pyrophoric and releases carbon monoxide upon decomposition. The National Institute for Occupational Safety and Health has recommended that workers should not be exposed to concentrations greater than 0.1 mg/m3 over an eight-hour time-weighted average, without the proper respiratory gear.

References

Carbonyl complexes
Organocobalt compounds
Chemical compounds containing metal–metal bonds